Kha (ख) (खवर्ण khavarna) is the second consonant of the Devanagari abugida. It ultimately arose from the Brahmi letter 𑀔, after having gone through the Gupta letter . Letters that derive from it are the Gujarati letter ખ, and the Modi letter 𑘏.

Devanagari-using languages

खण्ड = khand  "clause, fragment"
In this example, ख implements its inherent vowel, the schwa.

अखरोट = akhrot  "nonsense"
In this example, ख deletes the inherent schwa for correct pronunciation.

Certain words that have been borrowed from Persian and Arabic implement the nukta to more properly approximate the original word. It is then transliterated as a x.
ख़राब = xaraab  "bad"

Conjuncts with ख

Mathematics

Āryabhaṭa numeration
Aryabhata used Devanagari letters for numbers, very similar to that of the Greeks, even after the invention of Indian numerals.
The values of the different forms of ख are: 
ख  = 2 (२)
खि  = 200 (२००)
खु  = 20,000 (२० ०००)
खृ  = 2,000,000 (२० ०० ०००)
खॢ  = 20 (२०८)
खे  = 20 (२०१०)
खै  = 20 (२०१२)
खो  = 20 (२०१४)
खौ  = 20 (२०१६)

References

 Kurt Elfering: Die Mathematik des Aryabhata I. Text, Übersetzung aus dem Sanskrit und Kommentar. Wilhelm Fink Verlag, München, 1975, 
 Georges Ifrah: The Universal History of Numbers. From Prehistory to the Invention of the Computer. John Wiley & Sons, New York, 2000, .
 B. L. van der Waerden: Erwachende Wissenschaft. Ägyptische, babylonische und griechische Mathematik. Birkhäuser-Verlag, Basel Stuttgart, 1966, 
 
 

Devanagari letters